Blitar United Football Club was an Indonesian football club based in Blitar, East Java that competes in Liga 2. They nicknamed The Black Cats and play their home match at Gelora Supriyadi Stadium.

Supporter
Black Army is supporter of Blitar United.

Honours
 Liga Nusantara/Liga 3
 Champions: 2017
 Third-place: 2016
 Liga Nusantara/Liga 3 East Java Zone
 Champions: 2016, 2017

References

External links
 

Football clubs in Indonesia
Association football clubs established in 2012
 Association football clubs disestablished in 2019
Defunct football clubs in Indonesia